Denver shooting may refer to:

 2012 Aurora, Colorado shooting
 Thornton shooting, 2017
 2019 STEM School Highlands Ranch shooting
 2021 Denver shootings

See also 
 List of shootings in Colorado